Fuad Bayramov may refer to:
 Fuad Bayramov (footballer, born 1994)
 Fuad Bayramov (footballer, born 1998)